Italy national football C teams are the Italy national football team representative teams of Serie C (in the past Lega Pro Prima Divisione and Seconda Divisione). They are controlled by the Lega Italiana Calcio Professionistico and consist of U19, U20 and U21 teams.

The under-20 team is the B team of the Italy national under-20 football team and the U21 team is the C team of the Italy national under-21 football team; they also serve as feeder teams of the main team in the youth teams pyramid.

Some players also capped for the main team after played for the Lega Pro team and some players are called up to the Lega Pro team after appearing for Italy national under-19 football team.

The team also compete against representative teams of Group A, B and C of Seconda Divisione in annual Lega Pro Quadrangular Tournament, however it was cancelled in 2011–12 season, as there are only 4 groups from the two divisions of Lega Pro.

Recently, the regulation defined the team to be exclusive to Serie C owned players; players on loan from Serie A and B were excluded.

Recent Results

2013–15 International Challenge Trophy

2012–13 Under 20 Regional Competition

2011–13 International Challenge Trophy
Lega Pro used entire squad of born 1991 or after in 2011–12 season

2009–11 International Challenge Trophy

2008–09 Mirop Cup
17 February 2010  0–0 draw (U20 team, class 1989)
4 November 2009:  0–4 loss (U20 team, class 1989)

1 April 2009:  0–4 loss (U20 team, class 1988)
4 March 2009:  1–2 loss (U20 team, class 1988)
11 February 2009:  3–0 win (U20 team, class 1988)
3 December 2008:  1–1 draw (U20 team, class 1988)
22 October 2008:  2–1 win (U20 team, class 1988)
1 October 2008:  1–2 loss (U20 team, class 1988)

2007–09 International Challenge Trophy

2006–07 Mirop Cup
 28 March 2007  1–1 draw
 7 March 2007  2–1 win
 15 November 2006  1–1 draw
 25 October 2006  2–3 loss
 11 October 2006  1–1 draw
 29 March 2006  0–0 draw 
 15 March 2006  0–6 loss
 1 March 2006  1–0 win

2005–06 European Challenge Trophy

2004–05 Mirop Cup
 14 December 2005  2–1 win

http://www.lega-calcio-serie-c.it/it/Comunicati/Comunic2005/Lega/Lega%20289.pdf

2002–03 Mirop Cup
http://www.lega-calcio-serie-c.it/it/Comunicati/Comunic2004/Lega/Lega228.pdf

Friendlies
 14 February 2007  3–1 won

12 June 2011  Lost 0-3

23 November 2011  1–0 (U21 team; class 1990)

 12 June 2012  8–0 (U20 team; class 1992)

 29 November 2012  

 20 February 2013  

 11 March 2015

See also
Italy national football B team

References

representative teams
c team
Representative teams of association football leagues